Li Lianli (born 6 October 1974) is a Chinese short track speed skater. He competed at the 1992 Winter Olympics and the 1994 Winter Olympics.

References

1974 births
Living people
Chinese male short track speed skaters
Olympic short track speed skaters of China
Short track speed skaters at the 1992 Winter Olympics
Short track speed skaters at the 1994 Winter Olympics
Speed skaters from Changchun
20th-century Chinese people